Convoys Wharf, formerly called the King's Yard, is the site of Deptford Dockyard, the first of the Royal Dockyards, built on a riverside site in Deptford, by the River Thames in London, England. It was first developed in 1513 by Henry VIII to build vessels for the Royal Navy. Convoys Wharf also covers most of the site of Sayes Court manor house and gardens, home of diarist John Evelyn.

The site was owned until 2008 by News International, which used it to import newsprint and other paper products from Finland until early 2000. It is now owned by Hutchison Whampoa Limited and is subject to a planning application to convert it into residential units, although a large part of the site has safeguarded wharf status.

The eastern area adjoining Watergate Street was Palmers Wharf.

History

Royal Dockyard

The King's Yard was established in 1513 by Henry VIII as the first Royal Dockyard building vessels for the Royal Navy, and the leading dockyard of the period. It brought a large population and prosperity to Deptford.

The docks are also associated with the knighting of Sir Francis Drake by Queen Elizabeth I aboard the Golden Hind, the legend of Sir Walter Raleigh laying down his cape for Elizabeth, Captain James Cook's third voyage aboard Resolution, Frobisher's and Vancouver's voyages of discovery, despatching ships against the Spanish Armada, as well as for Nelson's battles including Trafalgar.

In 1698 Tsar Peter I of Russia aged 25, came to Deptford to learn about shipbuilding and seamanship. He was granted the use of John Evelyn's Sayes Court, adjoining the Royal Dockyard, by William III. In three months he and his party caused considerable damage to the famous gardens, and also to the house, with "much of the furniture broke, lost or destroyed". Sir Christopher Wren was instructed to survey the property and declared it "entirely ruined". At the mouth of Deptford Creek, on the Fairview Housing estate, there is a statue, designed by Mihail Chemiakin and gifted by Russia commemorating Peter's visit.

18th century and closure
By the 18th century, due to the silting of the Thames, the dockyard's use was restricted to ship building and distributing stores to other yards and fleets abroad. It was shut down from 1830 to 1844 and in 1864 a Parliamentary Committee recommended that the dockyards at Deptford (and Woolwich) should be closed. Their recommendation was accepted and the Deptford dockyard was closed in May 1869, by which time it employed 800 people. It had produced some 450 ships, the last being the wooden screw corvette HMS Druid launched in 1869.

Foreign Cattle Market

Before refrigeration cattle had to be imported alive, and the Contagious Diseases (Animals) Act 1869 gave the City of London Corporation exclusive local authority for foreign animal imports and processing subject to its opening a market before January 1872.

In 1907, 184,971 cattle and 49,350 sheep were imported through the market but by 1912 these figures had declined to 21,547 cattle and 11,993 sheep.

During the War years
The Foreign Cattle Market was taken over by the War Department in 1914, on a tenancy agreement from the City of London Corporation, for use as the Royal Army Service Corps Supply Reserve Depot. On several occasions after the Armistice traders and others urged that the market should be reopened; however, in 1924 the War Office exercised their option to buy it along with the adjacent the Sayes Court property for £400,500 under deeds dated 25 March 1926, 18 March 1927 & 25 July 1927 including the railway, tramway, wharfage and jetty rights and easements.

The Royal Naval Victualling Depot operated here which included a rum store. During the Second World War a bomb destroyed one of the storehouses and killed a number of men, a plaque was visible in the early 1970s commemorating this tragedy. During the war, because of the Blitz some of the stores were dispersed to various locations including Park Royal.

The yard also served as a United States' Advance Amphibious Vehicle base and married quarters during the Second World War.

Latter part of 20th century
On the closure of the Victualling Depot in the 1960s the establishment was renamed The Royal Naval Stores Depot and moved to a new building within Convoys Wharf. The Depot was the main Air Freight hub for the RN and was particularly busy during the Falklands War. It also continued as the central RN Stationery Store and Joint Services Baggage operations. The Depot closed in 1981.

The site purchased by News International from the UK Ministry of Defence for £1,600,000, and a remainder in 1986, for £340,000. In 1993 the Greenwich and Lewisham (London Borough Boundaries) Order transferred the site from the London Borough of Greenwich to the London Borough of Lewisham.

Archaeology
Most of the Tudor, Stuart, Georgian and Victorian structures above ground level that had survived until 1955 have since been destroyed. One structure that escaped the demolition is Olympia Warehouse, a unique cast-iron building constructed in the 1840s. However, archaeological surveys carried out by CgMs and Pre-Construct Archaeology in 2000 by Duncan Hawkins, in 2000 by Jon Lowe and in 2001 by David Divers, established that by far the greater part of the dockyard survives as buried structures filled in intact between 1869 and 1950. The structures of the yard proper, the docks, slips, basins, mast ponds, landing places and stairs, constitute a substantial architectural fabric that is currently extant, though largely invisible, being covered by superficial accretion or infill. As yet there has been no archaeological investigation of the garden area of Sayes Court, and only limited trial trenching of part of the manor house.

International recognition
In October 2013 Deptford Dockyard and Sayes Court garden were added to the World Monuments Fund's 2014 watch list.

Sayes Court

The War Department hired the Sayes Court area and almshouses, from the City of London Corporation from 19 September 1914 to use as a Horse Transport Reserve Depot at a rental of £90 per annum, to enlarge its Supply Reserve Depot at the Foreign Cattle Market.

The fee simple of the Foreign Cattle Market and of the Sayes Court property were purchased by the War Department, for £400,500, under deeds dated 25 March 1926, 18 March 1927 and 25 July 1927 including the railway, tramway, wharfage and jetty rights and easements.

Dockyard railways
From 15 December 1900 there was tramway access via Grove Street, to the Foreign Cattle Market, using their own Maudslay petrol locomotive. When the docks became an army depot the junction was relaid to standard gauge for direct connection to the LB&SCR. There was as well, an internal narrow-gauge tramway system. When the War Department took over, they introduced steam locomotives to work the tramways, purchasing between 1915 and 1917, twelve oil-fired Warril type  gauge locomotives from the Hunslet Engine Company. In December 1920 the Government announced the sale of the equipment from the railway at the Deptford Meat Depot. In 1921 Sir Robert Walker purchased three locos and 75 wagons for the Sand Hutton Light Railway, and purchased a fourth 1927. By January 1938 of the remaining eight locos, seven were apparently still in existence at Deptford, but out of use.

Development
In October 2000, 'Creekside Forum' set up the 'Convoys Opportunity' umbrella group in response to the News International Ltd plan to sell the  Convoys Wharf site. Convoys Opportunity, composed of community organisations, churches, businesses and others in Deptford and beyond, campaigned to have the News International scheme refused and the safeguarding order upheld.

In 2002 News International applied to the London Borough of Lewisham for outline planning permission to erect 3,500 residential units on the site. Lewisham councillors resolved to approve the application in May 2005. The Grade II listed Olympia Warehouse would have to be preserved and refurbished as part of the redevelopment of the site. New International engaged Richard Rogers to develop a masterplan for the site.

If the Mayor allowed the application it would then be referred to the Secretary of State for Communities and Local Government. Reasons for such a referral would include a Government direction that half the site is safeguarded for freight use. Since freight wharves on the Thames were safeguarded in 1997 by the then Secretary of State for the Environment, John Gummer, only one operational wharf has been lost to residential use without a full public inquiry. This was Delta/Blackwall Wharf, a major aggregates wharf redeveloped as part of the Greenwich Peninsula masterplan.

On 18 May 2005 a 50/50 joint venture company of Cheung Kong Holdings and Hutchison Whampoa entered into an agreement to acquire Convoys Wharf, to develop it as a mixed residential and commercial project, with News International retaining a profit share in the sale of the luxury homes proposed. In 2008 a new planning application was submitted by Hutchison based largely on the original Richard Rogers scheme.

In July 2011 Hutchison Whampoa engaged Aedas to develop a new masterplan for the site and submitted an amendment planning application. Then in early 2012 Hutchison appointed Terry Farrell to revise the masterplan for the site and submitted a planning application in April 2013.

In September 2011 a group of local residents launched a campaign, with the name Deptford Is.. to oppose the masterplan proposed by the developers. They have proposed a couple of projects to connect to the history of the area and benefit the local community. These are the Lenox project (see below) and Sayes Court Garden.

On 17 October 2013, Boris Johnson, the Mayor of London called in the application. In January 2014 Lewisham Council's strategic planning committee recommended that the outline planning application for Convoys Wharf in its current form be rejected.

On 22 January 2014 Dame Joan Ruddock challenged the government to recognise the unique heritage features of the site.

On 31 March 2014 Boris Johnson approved plans to build up to 3,500 new homes on the Convoys Wharf site that has been derelict since 2000.

A planning application to build a first major residential block of 456 flats, the first of 22 plots in Hutchison's masterplan, was approved by Lewisham Council in June 2020. Future plans include a 1.5 acre park on an existing river pontoon, cultural, commercial and retail space, and 3,500 homes including three towers up to 40 storeys tall.

The Lenox Project
In 2013 the Lenox Project put forward a formal proposal to build a full-size sailing replica of HMS Lenox, a 70-gun ship of the line originally built at Deptford Dockyard in 1678. The ship would actually be constructed on the dockyard site, and would form the centrepiece of a purpose-built museum which would remain as a permanent part of the development of Convoys Wharf.

By late 2015 the project had gathered momentum, with more detailed plans fitting the building of the Lenox into the overall development of this part of Deptford.
The 2015 Feasibility Study identified the Safeguarded Wharf at the Western end of the Convoys Wharf site as the most suitable place for the dry-dock where the ship herself would be built; the existing but disused canal entrance could then be modified to provide an entrance for the dock as well as a home berth for the finished ship.

It is hoped that the Lenox will provide a focus for the regeneration of the area as the comparable replica ship Hermione did for Rochefort in France.

See also
Deptford Dockyard

References

Further reading
Post-excavation assessment report and updated project design Museum of London Archaeology, November 2013
 An archaeological desk-based assessment, by Duncan Hawkins, CgMs Consulting, April 2000
 Preliminary Assessment of Surviving Historic Fabric Convoy's Wharf, Deptford, June 2000 by Jon Lowe
 Convoys Wharf, Deptford; TQ 3700 7820; (David Divers); evaluation; 9 October-14 November 2000; CgMs Consulting on behalf of News International PLC; CVW00
 An archaeological field evaluation (trial trenching) in consultation with English Heritage, by David Divers, CgMs Ltd., January 2001
 Our Future Heritage: A Framework for the Management of The Heritage Resource, Convoys Wharf, Deptford, London Borough of Lewisham.,English Heritage, October 2003
 London Snoring: A tale of missed opportunity Creekside Forum, Spring 2007
 "The Battle of Convoys Wharf" Kieran Long, London Evening Standard, 26 October 2011

External links
Deptford Is... blog about the proposed development of Convoys Wharf
Convoys Wharf development website
Lewisham Unitary Development Plan 2004, Schedule 3 – Areas of Archaeological Priority protected by Policy URB 21 Archaeology and shown on the Proposals Map
No more penthouses News Shopper, Lewisham & Greenwich, 17 May 2005
New look for old wharf News Shopper, Lewisham & Greenwich, 31 May 2005
Include tribute in wharf scheme News Shopper, Lewisham & Greenwich, 19 July 2005
Convoys Wharf, Deptford at GLIAS Notes and news, December 2009
Safeguarded Wharves - the official 2005 list and descriptions
Model of the Royal dockyard at Deptford in 1774

Archaeological sites in London
Buildings and structures in the London Borough of Lewisham
London docks
Military history of London
Ports and harbours of the Thames Estuary
Redeveloped ports and waterfronts in London
Redevelopment projects in London
Royal Navy bases in England
Royal Navy dockyards in England
Shipbuilding in London
History of the London Borough of Lewisham
Shipyards on the River Thames
Port of London
Wharves in the United Kingdom
18 in gauge railways in England
Industrial railways in England
Rail transport in London
Deptford